Thermistis taiwanensis is a species of beetle in the family Cerambycidae. It was described by Nara and Yu in 1992. It is known from Taiwan.

References

Saperdini
Beetles described in 1992